Goshen Scout Reservation is a Boy Scout reservation designated to camping, swimming, hiking and other various activities. Goshen is home to six Boy Scouts of America resident summer camps located near Goshen, Virginia, and is owned and operated by the National Capital Area Council. The camps are all built around Lake Merriweather. Within Goshen there are three Boy Scout camps, two Cub Scout camps, and one high adventure camp.

History

In 1960, the National Capital Area Council purchased land that bordered the Goshen and Little North Mountain Wildlife Management Area and Little Calfpasture River outside of Goshen, Virginia for $300,000. Lake Merriweather was named for Marjorie Merriweather Post, an ardent supporter of Scouting in the Washington, DC area. The individual camps bear the names of other significant individuals or corporations who supported National Capital Scouting as well. Camp Marriott owes its name to the Marriott International hospitality corporation while Camp PMI refers to Parking Management Incorporated (better known as PMI), a large parking company in the DC Metro region. In commemoration of the 50th anniversary of the reservation, the council hosted a camporee for youth, alumni, and families on memorial day weekend 2017.

Features

Goshen borders portions of the George Washington National Forest and other state parks. The reservation is about a 45-minute drive southwest of Harrisonburg; and about a 30-minute drive northwest of Lexington. The town of Goshen itself lies approximately 3 miles to the west of the reservation.

A common occurrence at the Goshen Scout Reservation is a fly-over by Air Force or Navy aircraft as crews conduct practice bomb-runs on the Goshen Dam. Sighted planes include C-5 Galaxies, F-16 Fighting Falcons, F/A-18 Hornets, F-15E Strike Eagles, and a V-22 Osprey.

High Adventure Camp

Camp Baird
Camp Baird is the base camp for the Lenhok'sin High Adventure program. Lenhok'sin offers "backpacking, caving, rappelling, horsemanship, black powder rifle shooting, fishing, and canoeing" The backpacking typically takes five days to travel over the "rough terrain in the Alleghany Mountains." Scouts can choose from a traditional backpacking trek, a Civil War week, a canoe trek, or a "COPE and Rope" trek. In a traditional trek, Scouts hike from outpost to outpost during the week and experience various activities with significance to history or high adventure sports. Scouts are on the trek from Monday morning to Friday afternoon. Throughout the week, crews may be found at the outposts, which are scattered around the reservation. LHA is recommended for Scouts at or above the age of 13, and in decent physical condition.

Boy Scout Camps

Camp Bowman 

Camp Bowman was the first camp to be built on the Goshen Scout Reservation hence their slogan, "Bowman, Bowman Number 1!" Camp Bowman is also the only camp to use its original camp sign. The camp is located directly across Lake Merriweather from Camp Olmsted. "Camp Bowman's entrance is just beyond the dam that compounds water for the lake."

Camp Bowman has been teaching Scouting values for over forty years. Various mementos can be found in the Admin Building, including gifts from several foreign staff members who were part of an international camp staff exchange program as well as staff neckerchiefs from early camp years. Every staff photo is on display, along with photos from the first year camp was open, as well as the medal given to every camper from the inaugural year.

Programs 
For six weeks each summer the camp is visited by 2,400 participants. Camp Bowman is the only camp at the Goshen Scout Reservation where all units use patrol cooking, rather than dining hall or meals picked up like take-out in a system that reservation camps call heater stack. Each patrol cooks at their campsite using a propane stove or campfire.

The first year camper program, called Bowman Brigade, focuses on the rank requirements of Scout, Tenderfoot, Second Class, and First Class. Staff introduce participants to different merit badges. The older Scout program with an age requirement of 14, called Bowman Vets, focuses on wakeboarding, action archery, an iron man competition, an introduction to the Lenhok'sin program, geocaching, search and rescue, water sports, and a hike to a higher altitude with an overnight stay. The Venturing Camp program is designed for rank advancement toward the Ranger and Summit awards as well as developing skills required for high adventure experiences like Lenhok'sin, Philmont, Summit, and Northern Tier.

Bowman offers counseling in the merit badges Archery, Architecture, Art, Astronomy, Basketry, Bird Study, Camping, Canoeing, Chemistry, Climbing, Communication, Cooking, Emergency Preparedness, Environmental Science, First Aid, Fish & Wildlife Management, Fishing, Forestry, Geology, Kayaking, Leatherwork, Lifesaving, Mammal Study, Motorboating, Music, Nature, Orienteering, Pioneering, Reptile & Amphibian Study, Rifle Shooting, Rowing, Shotgun Shooting, Small Boat Sailing, Swimming, Theater, Water Sports, Weather, Welding, Wilderness Survival, and Wood Carving. Other activities for groups include a Polar Bear Swim at sunrise, and canoe trips across Lake  Merriweather for a meal called a pirate's breakfast, as well as hiking treks to a scenic overlook called Viewing Rock.

Facilities 
Camp facilities include structures for administration, aquatics, archery range, campfire amphitheater, chapel, commissary, handicraft pavilion, leader lounge, nature, parade field, quartermaster, rifle range, Scoutcraft, shooting sports, shotgun range, shower house, and water tank. Camp Bowman is the only camp in Virginia with an action archery course, where Scouts participate in shooting at aerial, moving ground, field, and long distance targets. In addition, Bowman is the only camp on Goshen Scout Reservation with a rabbit clay trap on their shotgun range.

Camp Marriott
Camp Marriott is one of the seven camps on the Goshen Scout Reservation. Most Scouts who attend during summer months are between the ages of 11 and 15. Camp Marriott is well known for being one of the few Scout camps left that continues the tradition of patrol cooking. However, to create ease for the Scouts, heater stack meals are prepared in the camp kitchen to be picked up and prepared by the Scouts at their own separate campsites.

Camp Marriott contains twelve campsites. There are two rifle pavilions, a shotgun range, and one archery range. The waterfront area is one of the largest on the lake, with close proximity to the administration building. Eagle Required Merit Badges are offered at the Eagle's Eyrie, including cooking. The Ecology area offers three separate teaching areas that immerse you in the outdoors, the Pan Zoological Park that is full of local flora and fauna, and a highly regarded nature trail. Camp Marriott has long running traditions, excellent program, physical layout, and a fair distance from Camp Post.

On June 26, 2016 twins Eliana and Jeremy Bookbinder, both with experience handling raptors from volunteering at the Clearwater Nature Center in Clinton, Maryland, found an injured young bald eagle near the camp. A supervisor instructed the two to leave the badly injured animal alone. The two captured the bird and took it to a wildlife rehabilitator. Citing the policy that "no wild animals are to be handled or captured (except by properly trained staff)" the two were fired. The eagle, that had a wing broken in multiple places, was so badly injured that it was euthanized.

Camp Olmsted
Named after General George H. Olmsted, Camp Olmsted is unique among the Boy Scout camps on the lake in that it is the only camp on the lake with a Tech Center where technology related merit badges are taught. In addition to the Tech Center, the camp offers Shooting Sports, Handicraft, Ecology, Scoutcraft, Trailshead and Aquatics areas. A program that is unique to Camp Olmsted is the X-Pride program, which provides an opportunity for older Scouts to participate in high-adventure activities while the younger Scouts in their troop work on merit badges. X-pride Scouts participate in activities such as rock climbing, GPS orienteering, and an overnight trip to Viewing Rock. In 2010, Olmsted introduced a new program area, Culturecraft, which focuses on Fine Arts Merit Badges such as Theater, Music, Art, Cinematography, Architecture, Sculpture, and Photography. The camp contains 20 camping sites, and one staff site. In addition, it is the only camp on the lake that offers over 60 merit badges; many of these not traditionally seen at a summer camp, such as Communications, Radio, and others in that sort of field. Olmsted is the camp in Goshen with the highest number of Scouts that attend and staff members.

Webelos camps

Camp PMI

In 2021, Camp PMI was closed and did not reopen in 2022. All Webelos activities were moved to Camp Ross.

Camp Ross
Camp Ross is one of two Webelos camps at Goshen Scout Reservations. It is one of the newest camps on the lake having been closed after the 1978 camping season due to decreased overall Reservation attendance. Ross was reopened in 1981 as a Webelos camp and has operated as such until present day. The camp currently has 11 campsites but was originally built with 10, expanded to 12 and subsequently one was closed due to poor drainage. The camp takes a quite a large area at the entrance to Lake Merriweather where it is fed by the Little Calfpasture River.

The camp is the farthest one away from Camp Post. The campsites that the campers sleep in are arranged in arch formations around the central dining hall, staff site, shower house, and activity areas. The farthest site is site five; it is about 3/4 of a mile walk from the center of camp. In the southwest corner of the camp there is a large white pine forest that was planted by Scouts in the 1960s to reforest the area. Since the planting of the trees they have been logged at least once to thin out the underbrush. One can still follow the old logging road back into this area where it meets up with the Anderson trail which in turn goes all the way around the lake through all seven camps. The White Pine meets the lake at a very steep grade and one can look straight across and see the waterfront of Camp Marriott. Within the White Pine there is a cemetery containing four graves that date back to the 1850s. Although it is quite overgrown it is of much interest to many staffers and used as a topic for ghost stories with the Scouts. The camp has several activity areas for the Webelos Scouts including Aquatics, Scoutcraft, Nature, Handicraft, Archery, and BB Gun Shooting.

Other camps

Camp Post 
Camp Post is the central administration area, home to several intercamp programs such as Project COPE, which includes a climbing tower and ropes course. It is also home to many administrative staff, including the reservation director and camping specialist.

Family Camp 
Family Camp is a now unused camp which can be used upon request by individuals and groups. It is located almost directly across from Camp Ross waterfront and functions as the Camp Baird Waterfront as well as the Lenhok'sin Caving Outpost during the summer.

In popular culture
The fictional character Kim Bauer wears a Goshen Boy Scout Reservation shirt during the first season of the drama 24.

See also
 Goshen Pass
 Goshen Pass Natural Area Preserve

External links

References

Northeast Region (Boy Scouts of America)
Summer camps in Virginia
Youth organizations based in Virginia
1967 establishments in Virginia